The Pandemic Pandemonium Sessions are a digital download collection of singles by the Norwegian gothic metal one-man band Mortemia. The singles have been released through 2021 and 2022. Unlike Mortemia's first album, Misere Mortem, these singles have a more melodic and diverse musical concept. There is a female guest vocalist in each song instead of the characteristic symphonic choir.

Track listing

Personnel

Mortemia
Morten Veland – vocals, all instruments, production, engineering, mixing

Additional personnel and staff
 Madeleine Liljestam – female vocals (track 1)
 Marcela Bovio – female vocals (track 2)
 Alessia Scolletti – female vocals (track 3)
 Liv Kristine – female vocals (track 4)
 Melissa Bonny – female vocals (track 5)
 Brittney Slayes – female vocals (track 6)
 Maja Shining – female vocals (track 7)
 Erica Ohlsson – female vocals (track 8)
 Heidi Parviainen – female vocals (track 9)
 Zora Cock – female vocals (track 10)
 Linda Toni Grahn – female vocals (track 11)
 Caterina Nix – female vocals (track 12)

References

2021 EPs